Onopsus served as Greek Patriarch of Alexandria sometime between the 7th and 8th centuries; the exact dates are not known.

8th-century Patriarchs of Alexandria